The Porky Pig Show is an American television anthology series hosted by Porky Pig, that was composed of Looney Tunes and Merrie Melodies theatrical cartoons made between 1948 and 1964. The series aired on ABC Saturday mornings from 1964 to 1967, with 26 half-hour episodes created. In rare times as of the 2010s, the show aired reruns on Canal 5 in Mexico.

Format 
Each show began with a newly-animated title sequence featuring a theme song by Barbara Cameron, in which Porky welcomes his friends into a barn to dance and watch his show. Following the three cartoons featured on the program (the first one always featuring Porky, and few of which would be featured on any incarnation of The Bugs Bunny Show until the 1990s), a closing sequence played in which Porky's friends say goodbye and promise to return the following week. The opening and closing were produced by Hal Seeger Productions. Warner Bros. had shut down their own cartoon studio in the previous year.

Episodes

Home media 
Episode #1 of The Porky Pig Show was released on DVD, as part of Warner Home Video's Saturday Morning Cartoons: 1960s, Volume 1 two-disc set, on May 26, 2009. Episode #3 was included in Saturday Morning Cartoons: 1960s, Volume 2, released on October 27, 2009.

External links 
 

Looney Tunes television series
1960s American animated television series
1964 American television series debuts
1967 American television series endings
1960s American anthology television series
American children's animated anthology television series
American Broadcasting Company original programming
Television series by Warner Bros. Television Studios
Animated television series about pigs